Never Back Down 2: The Beatdown (also known as The Fighters 2: The Beatdown) is a 2011 American martial arts film starring Evan Peters, Michael Jai White, Dean Geyer, Alex Meraz, Todd Duffee, Scott Epstein and Jillian Murray. It is a sequel to the 2008 film Never Back Down. The film made its world premiere at the ActionFest film festival in Asheville, North Carolina, on April 8, 2011 and was released on DVD on September 13, from Sony Pictures Home Entertainment. The film marks White's directorial debut.

Plot
Max Cooperman is in charge of another upcoming fight at the underground event "The Beatdown", and four fighters are training in a vacant lot under very-experienced martial artist Case Walker: Zack Gomes, who recently quit boxing after sustaining a partially detached retina from a match; MMA fighter Tim Newhouse, whose family is in debt following the death of his father; Mike Stokes, a college student dealing with issues of his father leaving his mother for another man; and Justin Epstein, a comic book store clerk who is the frequent target of bullying. Max offers Case the chance to make some money and at the same time, help him promote the Beatdown. A few weeks into training, the four trainees argue over their reasons for training and deserving to be there more, the worst of it being Justin and Zack hurting each other physically, leaving them to settle it themselves. Later on, Case is harassed by police officers, who threaten him for violating his probation. Because of this, the team builds a new gym where they can train and hold the Beatdown tournament.

Danger strikes when Justin snaps from constant bullying, goes rogue and decides to not only attack his personal enemies but also the group itself by framing their mentor and setting him up to go to jail. The rest of the group, in revenge, band together and take on Justin at the Beatdown. With each facing their own trials to reach the final match, it comes down to only one of them versus their own. Mike defeats Zack, while Justin injures Tim in the restroom, thus eliminating him from the tournament. In the tournament finals, Mike engages Justin in a grueling fight until he wins by breaking Justin's right shoulder via an Omoplata submission hold. Justin attempts to retaliate by jumping Mike from behind, but Mike counters with a superman punch to the face. As Mike and his girlfriend Eve celebrate his win, he finally calls his father and ask him to go out to dinner because they have a lot to talk about. Case gets a call from "Big" John McCarthy and confirms his return to MMA.

Cast
 Dean Geyer as Mike "Wrestler Kid" Stokes
 Alex Meraz as Zack "Smoke and Thunder" Gomes
 Michael Jai White as Casey "Case" Walker Jr.
 Jillian Murray as Eve
 Scott Epstein as Justin Epstein
 Evan Peters as Max Cooperman
 Todd Duffee as Tim Newhouse
 Laura Cayouette as Vale
 Lyoto Machida as Himself
 "Big" John McCarthy as Himself
 Eddie Bravo as D.J. Bravo

Production
Filming started in September 2010 and finished in November in Baton Rouge, Louisiana.

Soundtrack
 Rular Rah – "It's Supposed to Happen"
 Rular Rah – "The Freshest"
 Joe Jackson feat. Skratch Music – "Super Star"
 Stephen R. Phillips & Tim P. – "Lick My Plate"
 Tucker Jameson & The Hot Mugs – "Train Tracks"
 Rick Balentine – "1st Attack of the Marms"
 Willknots – "Perfect Day"
 Startisan – "Just"
 For The Taking – "Time Is Running Out"
 Justyna Kelley – "Fall Into You"
 Stereo Black – "Inside"
 Metaphor the Great & Jonathan Jackson – "Doo Doo Butt"
 Kritical – "Are You Ready for This"
 Pre-Fight Hype – "It's Goin Down"
 Robert Fortune – "Cadillac"
 The Resistors – "UTA"
 For The Taking – "Takedown"
 Rular Rah – "Only If You Knew"
 Compella and The Twister – "Are You Ready"
 Cody B. Ware – "#33 Forever"[A]
 Tucker Jameson & The Hot Mugs – "Last Train Home"
 Compella and The Twister – "Dropped"

Notes
A ^"#33 Forever" by Cody B. Ware is mistitled as "Are You Ready" in the DVD credits.

Home media
The film was released on DVD on September 13, 2011, from Sony Pictures Home Entertainment.

Sequel

A sequel, titled Never Back Down: No Surrender, was released on June 7, 2016. It began filming in Thailand again under the direction of White, who also reprises his role as Case Walker. The film also stars Esai Morales, MMA fighter Josh Barnett, Tony Jaa, former professional wrestler Nathan Jones and Gillian Waters.

References

External links
 
 
 

2011 films
2011 action films
American independent films
American martial arts films
American coming-of-age films
American teen films
American boxing films
Direct-to-video sequel films
2010s English-language films
Films directed by Michael Jai White
Films set in Louisiana
Films shot in Louisiana
Martial arts tournament films
Mixed martial arts films
Stage 6 Films films
Underground fighting films
2011 martial arts films
2011 directorial debut films
2010s American films